Fourteen nations would qualify for the Olympic tournament, eight to the preliminary round, and six to the first round.  The IIHF used the standings of the 1999 Men's World Ice Hockey Championships to determine qualification.  First, the top six nations from Pool A would go directly to the first round.  The preliminary round was made up of the nations ranked seventh and eighth, along with six others from a series of qualification tournaments.  The nations ranked nine through twelve went straight to the final qualification round, with all other participants playing through pre-qualification tournaments.

Regional Qualification
Two Regional qualifiers were used to thin the field for Pre-Qualification to sixteen nations.
Far East
Played September 3–5, 1999 in Aomori, Japan.

European
Played December 11–12, 1999 in Sofia Bulgaria.  Croatia should have played as well, but the proper application was accidentally not sent to the IIHF.
December 11   7 - 6  
December 12   7 - 4

Olympic Pre-Qualification
Four tournaments were played February 10–13, 2000, with the winner of each advancing to the final qualification round.
Group 1
Played in Ljubljana, Slovenia

Group 2
Played in Tallinn, Estonia

Group 3
Played in Gdańsk, Poland

Group 4
Played in Copenhagen, Denmark

Final Olympic Qualification
Two tournaments were played February 8–11, 2001, with 6 of the remaining 8 nations qualifying for the Olympics.

Group A

All times are local (UTC+1).

Group B

All times are local (UTC+1).

References

External links
Far East Qualifier results
European, pre-qualifying, and final qualifying results
Group A official results
Group B official results

Ice hockey at the 2002 Winter Olympics
Oly
Oly
Oly